Camp Wilder is an American television sitcom which aired on ABC from September 18, 1992 until February 26, 1993. The premise centered on a young woman who opens up her home to the friends of her younger siblings, who sought it as judgment-free "hangout", and who regularly went to her for advice. The series was created by Matthew Carlson, and produced by a.k.a. Productions in association with Capital Cities Entertainment.

The show aired as a part of ABC's TGIF lineup, but was cancelled after 19 episodes due to low ratings. A twentieth episode was produced, but was never aired in the United States. Camp Wilder was also shown in the UK, Spain and Germany.

Synopsis
Ricky Wilder (Mary Page Keller) is a 28-year-old nurse and single mother, raising her family in her childhood home after her parents' deaths. Ricky's only actual child was her 6-year-old daughter Sophie (Tina Majorino), but she was also the principal guardian to her teenage siblings, 16-year-old Brody (Jerry O'Connell) and 13-year-old Melissa (Meghann Haldeman). From the time their parents died, Ricky understood that she couldn't change out of her persona as the "cool, approachable" older sister, and mixed parenting tactics in with the setting of a casual, laissez-faire household. In fact, the atmosphere in the Wilder house was so laid-back that many of Brody and Melissa's friends sought it as a refuge from the stricter, more confining homes run by their traditional parents. Ricky thus welcomed them all in with open arms, and they regularly sat around the family's kitchen table and dished about life's various happenings and dilemmas, while Ricky helped them sort out their issues and dispensed sound advice in a non-judgmental, friend-like way. As a result, the neighborhood youth nicknamed their home "Camp Wilder."

Among the regular inhabitants of Camp Wilder were Brody's off-kilter best friend Dorfman (Jay Mohr) and Melissa's friends Beth (Margaret Langrick) and Danielle (Hilary Swank). Many other friends and classmates of theirs passed through Camp Wilder in guest appearances, most notably Dexter (Jared Leto), a hip, motorcycle-riding bad boy who Danielle had the hots for. However, it was goofball Dorfman who quickly became the show's breakout character, with his gross-out humor causing friction with the girls, and Ricky's numerous attempts to help him become an upstanding young man (i.e., teaching him work ethic by giving him a job as an orderly at her hospital, saving him from being held back in school by becoming his tutor, etc.). Other stories focused on the escapades of the Wilders, and especially on Sophie, who was beginning to look up to Brody as a surrogate father figure rather than just as an uncle. Throughout the show's 20 episodes, she began exhibiting tomboyish traits, and at Christmas, she told the family that all she wanted was to be a boy.

Cast

Main
Mary Page Keller as  Ricky Wilder
Jerry O'Connell as  Brody Wilder, Ricky's younger brother
Jay Mohr as Dorfman, Brody's best friend
Meghann Haldeman as  Melissa Wilder, Ricky's younger sister
Margaret Langrick as Beth, Melissa's best friend
Hilary Swank as Danielle, Melissa's other best friend
Tina Majorino as  Sophie Wilder, Ricky's daughter

Recurring
Jared Leto as  Dexter

Episodes

Awards and nominations

External links
 
 
 Camp Wilder intro from Retrojunk

1992 American television series debuts
1993 American television series endings
1990s American sitcoms
American Broadcasting Company original programming
English-language television shows
Television series about siblings
Television shows set in Santa Monica, California
Television series by Disney–ABC Domestic Television
TGIF (TV programming block)